Ohradzany is a small village and municipality in Humenné District in the Prešov Region of eastern Slovakia.

History
In historical records the village was first mentioned in 1317.
The first archbishop of the Košice Episcopal see, Monsignor Alojz Tkáč, was born here in 1934. the current mayor is Valéria Melníková.

Geography
The municipality lies at an altitude of 170 metres and covers an area of 12.001 km².
It has a population of about 625 people.

External links
 
https://web.archive.org/web/20070927203415/http://www.statistics.sk/mosmis/eng/run.html 

Villages and municipalities in Humenné District